Caetano e Chico – juntos e ao vivo is a 1972 live album by Brazilian musicians Caetano Veloso and Chico Buarque. It was recorded in Salvador's Teatro Castro Alves shortly after Veloso returned from his exile in London, imposed by the ruling Brazilian military dictatorship. Because of the political connotation of the songs and the repressive nature of the regime at the time, audience shouts and clapping were made intentionally louder in some parts of the album which contained verses that the censors had vetoed.

Track listing
 "Bom Conselho" (Buarque) – 2:00
 "Partido Alto" (Buarque) – 5:32
 "Tropicália" (Veloso) – 3:30
 "Morena dos Olhos d'Água" (Buarque) – 2:32
 "A Rita"/"Esse Cara" (Buarque/Veloso) – 3:35
 "Atrás da Porta" (Buarque, Francis Hime) – 2:44
 "Você Não Entende Nada"/"Cotidiano" (Veloso/Buarque) – 7:01
 "Bárbara" (Buarque, Ruy Guerra) – 3:50
 "Ana de Amsterdam" (Buarque, Ruy Guerra) – 1:45
 "Janelas Abertas Nº2" (Veloso) – 1:56
 "Os Argonautas" (Veloso) – 3:23

References

1972 live albums
Caetano Veloso live albums
Chico Buarque albums